Combe, meaning Valley in old West Country English/Celtic, similar to Welsh equivalent 'cwm', may refer to:

English place names
 Combe, Berkshire
 Combe, Buckfastleigh, Devon
 Combe, Yealmpton, Devon
 Combe, Herefordshire
 Combe, Oxfordshire
 Combe, Somerset

Places in England with combe as one word in part of their name

Cumbria 
 Black Combe

Devon 
 Combe Fishacre
 Combe Martin
 Combe Pafford
 Combe Raleigh
 Ilfracombe
 Chambercombe
 Woolacombe
 Slewton Combe
 In Torquay, Devon
 Ellacombe, Devon
 Babbacombe
 , area and ward in Torbay, Devon, England
 Maidencombe

Dorset 
 Combe Almer

Hereford 
 Combe Moor

Oxford 
 Combe Longa, Oxfordshire

Somerset 
 Combe Down
 Combe Florey
 Combe Hay
 Combe St Nicholas
 Combe Throop/Templecombe
 Monkton Combe

Surrey 
 Combe Common

Wiltshire 
 Castle Combe

Other uses
 Combe (surname)
 Combe (Middle-earth), a fictional village in J. R. R. Tolkien's writings
 Combe (mythology), name of a character in Greek mythology
 Kombe people, an ethnic group from Equatorial Guinea
 Kombe language, spoken by the Combe ethnic group from Equatorial Guinea
 Combe (business), the company that gave the world Odor Eaters, Clearasil, Lanacane
 "Combe" (poem), a poem by Patti Smith from her 1978 book Babel (book)
 Combe Magna, the fictional home of John Willoughby of Sense and Sensibility by Jane Austen, in Somersetshire

See also
 Combe Hill (disambiguation)
 Coomb (disambiguation)
 Coombe (disambiguation)
 Coombes, West Sussex, England

Valleys of the United Kingdom

es:Combe